American Community School may refer to:
American Community School at Beirut
American Community School in Amman, a private, preparatory, international school in Amman
ACS International Schools, a group of four private schools, three in England and one in Qatar

See also
ACS (disambiguation)